Christian Brand (born 23 May 1972) is a German football coach and former player who coaches Werder Bremen youth teams.

Playing career
A midfielder, Brand began his career at VfB Oldenburg and made his debut for the club on 27 August 1991 in a match against FC St. Pauli. In his first season Brand played 13 games as Oldenburg narrowly missed out on promotion, finishing in second place behind Bayer Uerdingen.

Coaching career
After retiring from football, Brand became the new assistant manager of FC Thun in the summer 2007. On 7 January 2008, he was appointed as a youth coach of the FC Luzern. 
After the former coach Rolf Fringer was sacked on 2 May 2011, he was named caretaker manager of the Luzern first team and will be replaced by Murat Yakin at the end of the season.

He was appointed as the head coach of Jahn Regensburg on 18 November 2014.

He was appointed as the head coach of Hansa Rostock on 7 December 2015. He was sacked on 13 May 2017.

Honours
Werder Bremen
 DFB-Pokal: 1998–99

References

External links

Living people
1972 births
People from Quakenbrück
Association football midfielders
Footballers from Lower Saxony
German footballers
Bundesliga players
2. Bundesliga players
3. Liga managers
VfB Oldenburg players
VfL Osnabrück players
FC Bremerhaven players
SV Werder Bremen players
SV Werder Bremen II players
VfL Wolfsburg players
FC Hansa Rostock players
FC Luzern players
SC Kriens players
German football managers
FC Luzern managers
SSV Jahn Regensburg managers
FC Hansa Rostock managers
West German footballers